List of airports in Georgia may refer to:

List of airports in Georgia (country)
List of airports in Georgia (U.S. state)